This is a list of notable water buffalo cheeses. Water buffalo cheese is produced using the milk from the water buffalo. Some buffalo milk cheeses are produced using the milk from other animals as well, such as cow's milk.

Water buffalo cheeses

 Bagot ni horbo, dali ni horbo, or simply dali is a cheese-like traditional Batak dish from Tapanuli, North Sumatra, Indonesia, with a yellowish white appearance with tofu-like texture and milky flavor. Dali is made by boiling buffalo milk coagulated with papaya leaf or unripe pineapple juice.
 Bocconcini – a small mozzarella cheese the size of an egg, like other mozzarellas, it is semi-soft, white and rindless unripened mild cheese which originated in Naples, Italy and was once made only from milk of water buffalo. Nowadays they are usually made from a combination of water buffalo and cow's milk.
 Buffalo mozzarella – a mozzarella made from the milk of Mediterranea Italiana buffalo. It is a dairy product traditionally manufactured in Campania, Italy, especially in the provinces of Caserta and Salerno.
 Burrata – a fresh Italian buffalo milk cheese prepared using the pasta filata method.
 Caciotta – a range of types of cheese produced especially in the central regions of Italy from the milk of cows, sheep, goats or water buffalo
 Casatica – a sweet rinded log shaped cheese produced in Northern Italy.
 Dangke – a type of cheese produced in South Sulawesi, Indonesia, especially in Enrekang, Baraka, Anggeraja, and Alla districts. Dangke is processed by boiling fresh buffalo milk with sliced papaya leaves, stems, or unripe papaya fruits. Dangke is typically soaked in a brine solution overnight before being wrapped with banana leaves for masking the bitter taste caused by the addition of papaya leaves.
 Domiati – a soft white salty cheese made primarily in Egypt, but also in Sudan and other Middle Eastern countries. Typically made from buffalo milk, cow milk, or a mixture, it can also be made from other milks, such as sheep, goat or camel milk.
 Kesong puti – a Filipino soft, unaged, white cheese made from unskimmed carabao's milk, salt, and rennet.
 Khoa – a dairy product widely used in the cuisine of the Indian Subcontinent, it is made using both cow's and water buffalo milk.
 Litsusu and cologanti – a type of cheese produced in East and West Nusa Tenggara, Indonesia, with enzymes from litsusu tree as coagulant.
 Mozzarella – a traditionally southern Italian dairy product made from Italian buffalo's milk by the pasta filata method. Mozzarella received a Traditional Specialities Guaranteed certification from the European Union in 1998. This protection scheme requires that mozzarella sold in the European Union is produced according to a traditional recipe.
 Nguri – a buffalo's milk cheese of the Fujian province in China, it is prepared in a ball-shape approximately the size of a table tennis ball, and has a soft, leathery texture.
 Stracciatella di bufala – produced from Italian buffalo milk in the province of Province of Foggia, located in the southern Italian region of Apulia. It is prepared using a stretching (pasta filata) and a shredding technique.
 Surti paneer – a soft cheese associated with Surat in India, it is a type of paneer prepared from buffalo milk which is coagulated using rennet.

See also

 List of cheeses
 List of dairy products
 Lists of prepared foods

References

 
Water buffalo